Stevan Tontić (30 December 1946 – 12 February 2022) was a Bosnian writer and translator.

Biography
Tontić studied philosophy and sociology in Sarajevo, where he later lived and worked as an editor. After the Siege of Sarajevo in 1992, he stayed in exile in Germany until his return in 2001. In his works, he often wrote about the collapse of southern Slavic civilizations. He also dealt with his experiences of war and exile.

He died on 12 February 2022, at the age of 75.

Works
Handschrift aus Sarajevo (1998)
Sonntag in Berlin (2000)
Im Auftrag des Wortes. Texte aus dem Exil (2004)
Der tägliche Weltuntergang (2015)

His literary work is a part of common heritage of Serbs, Croats, Montenegrins and Bosniaks.

Awards
Horst Bienek Prize for Poetry (2000)
 (2001)
Heidelberg-Preis of the Bayerische Akademie der Schönen Künste (2012)
 (2019)

References

1946 births
2022 deaths
Bosnia and Herzegovina poets
Translators from German
People from Sanski Most